The 1958 Iowa State Cyclones football team represented Iowa State College of Agricultural and Mechanic Arts (renamed Iowa State University in 1959) in the Big Seven Conference during the 1958 NCAA University Division football season. In their first year under head coach Clay Stapleton, the Cyclones compiled a 4–6 record (0–6 against conference opponents), finished in last place in the conference, and outscored their opponents by a combined total of 127 to 88. They played their home games at Clyde Williams Field in Ames, Iowa.

The team's regular starting lineup on offense consisted of left end Jim Winstead, left tackle Charles Martin, left guard Ray Fauser, center Arden Esslinger, right guard Jerry Donohue, right tackle Larry Van Der Heyden, right end Gale Gibson, quarterback Cliff Rick, left halfback Dwight Nichols, right halfback Tom Watkins, and fullback Chuck Lamson. Gale Gibson was the team captain.

The team's statistical leaders included Dwight Nichols with 815 rushing yards and 357 passing yards, Gale Gibson with 148 receiving yards, and Bob Harden with 42 points scored (seven touchdowns). Dwight Nichols was selected as a first-team all-conference player.

Schedule

References

Iowa State
Iowa State Cyclones football seasons
Iowa State Cyclones football